Situka (A Call for Action) is a Ugandan feature film about two lovers: Amanio (Hellen Lukoma), an ambitious young woman with a passion for politics, who inspires her boyfriend Muganga (Bobi Wine), an industrious young daredevil, to stand up for justice in society.

Situka explores relevant social issues, inspiring young people to be more involved in their communities, rather than expecting the government to provide for them.

Synopsis
Muganga runs a prominent bar near the university. Admired by his peers, he struggles with his purpose and influence until his girlfriend Amanio's life is put at risk. Uganda's political and social services fail her, and Muganga is moved to fight for his love and his people.

Cast and characters
 Bobi Wine as  Muganga, an industrious young man and daredevil; Amanio's boyfriend, university graduate, and bar owner
 Hellen Lukoma as Amanio, an ambitious young woman with a passion for politics; Muganga's girlfriend
 Raymond Rushabiro as Kazungu
 Michael Wawuyo as Muwaddada

Production
Production of Situka started in 2015 and in May of the same year, the movie was released at the National Theater, Kampala, with the producer and director Hannington Bugingo praising Bobi Wine as the best Ugandan actor. It was shot on location on Kalangala island district and Masese, Jinja district. Bobi Wine read through the movie script once on the first day of shooting. The film was produced with the support of youth advocacy NGO Twaweza, with the aim of spreading the message that youths should take action on issues that affect them.

See also
 The Life (2012 Film)
 Bala Bala Sese

References

External links
 Situka - Uganda Film Festival (archived)

2015 films
Films shot in Uganda
Films set in Uganda
Films about music and musicians
2015 drama films
English-language Ugandan films
Ugandan drama films
2010s English-language films